Manolya Onur, Princess Qhabl Begum Sahiba Manolya-i-Nur (1955 – 25 October 2017) was a Turkish pageant queen and model who became a princess of Ottoman empire and a princess of Berar by marriage. She was a former Miss Turkey.

Career

She competed in the Miss Turkey pageant in 1976 and represented Turkey in the 1976 Miss Universe beauty pageant. Manolya had a career as a model from 1976 to 1978. She spent six years in France studying English, French, German as well as the History of Art at the Sorbonne University, France.

Personal life

She was a granddaughter-in-law of Sultan Abdülmecid II, the last Ottoman Caliph. Manolya married with Mukarram Jah in August 1992 at Çırağan Palace, Hyderabad and became a princess styled as H.E.H. Manolya-i-Nur Begum Sahiba. She lived in India and Australia during her marriage. Their daughter Nilufer (named after Princess Niloufer) was born in 1993. Nizam divorced Manolya in 1997 at Geneva, Switzerland. After her divorce, Manolya moved back to Turkey and since then she had been living in Istanbul and working for charitable institutions such as the Osteoporosis Patient Society.  She died in 2017.

References

External links
Manolya's profile in osteoporosis foundation website

1955 births
2017 deaths
Miss Universe 1976 contestants
Turkish beauty pageant winners
University of Paris alumni